The Amiral Charner class was a group of four armoured cruisers built for the French Navy during the 1890s. They were designed to be smaller and cheaper than the preceding design while also serving as commerce raiders in times of war. Three of the ships were assigned to the International Squadron off the island of Crete during the 1897–1898 uprising there and the Greco-Turkish War of 1897 to protect French interests and citizens. With several exceptions the sister ships spent most of the first decade of the 20th century serving as training ships or in reserve. Bruix aided survivors of the devastating eruption of Mount Pelée on the island of Martinique in 1902. Chanzy was transferred to French Indochina in 1906 and ran aground off the Chinese coast in mid-1907. She proved impossible to refloat and was destroyed in place.

The three survivors escorted troop convoys from French North Africa to France for several months after the beginning of World War I in August 1914. Unlike her sisters, Bruix was transferred to the Atlantic to support Allied operations against the German colony of Kamerun in September 1914 while Amiral Charner and Latouche-Tréville were assigned to the Eastern Mediterranean. where they blockaded the Ottoman-controlled coast, and supported Allied operations. Amiral Charner was sunk in early 1916 by a German submarine. Latouche-Tréville became a training ship in late 1917 and was decommissioned in 1919. Bruix was decommissioned in Greece at the beginning of 1918 and recommissioned after the end of the war in November for service in the Black Sea against the Bolsheviks. She returned home in 1919 and was sold for scrap in 1921. Latouche-Tréville followed her to the breakers five years later.

Design and description

Like the older ship, they were intended to fill the commerce-raiding strategy of the Jeune École.

They were fitted with a prominent plough-shaped ram at the bow. This made the ships very wet forward, although they were generally felt to be reasonably good sea boats and handled well by their captains. Their metacentric height was deemed to be inadequate and all of the surviving ships had their military masts replaced by lighter pole masts between 1910 and 1914.

The Amiral Charner-class ships had two horizontal triple-expansion steam engines, each driving a single propeller shaft.

Armament
The ships of the Amiral Charner class had a main armament that consisted of two 45-calibre Canon de 194 mm Modèle 1887 guns that were mounted in single gun turrets, one each fore and aft of the superstructure. The turrets were hydraulically operated in all ships except on Latouche-Tréville, whose turrets were electrically powered.

Their secondary armament comprised six 45-calibre Canon de 138.6 mm Modèle 1887 guns, each in single gun turrets on each broadside. For close-range anti-torpedo boat defense, they carried four quick-firing (QF)  guns, four QF  and eight QF  five-barreled revolving Hotchkiss guns. They were also armed with four  pivoting torpedo tubes; two mounted on each broadside above water.

Protection
Protecting the boiler rooms, engine rooms, and magazines below it was a thin splinter deck. Below the protective deck the ship was divided by 13 watertight transverse bulkheads with five more above it. The ship's conning tower and turrets were protected by 92 millimeters of armor.

Ships

Service

Amiral Charner spent most of her career in the Mediterranean, although she was sent to China during the Boxer Rebellion of 1900–01. Together with her sisters, Chanzy and Latouche-Tréville, the ship was assigned to the International Squadron off the island of Crete during the 1897-1898 upring there and the Greco-Turkish War of 1897 to protect French interests and citizens. With the exception of Bruix, the sisters spent most of the first decade of the 20th century as training ships or in reserve. Bruix served in the Atlantic Ocean, the Mediterranean, and in the Far East before World War I. In 1902 she aided survivors of the devastating eruption of Mount Pelée on the island of Martinique and spent several years as guardship at Crete, protecting French interests in the region in the early 1910s. Chanzy was transferred to French Indochina in 1906. She ran aground off the Chinese coast in mid-1907, where she proved impossible to refloat and was destroyed in place after her crew was rescued without loss.

The surviving ships escorted troop convoys from French North Africa to France for several months after the beginning of World War I in August 1914. Amiral Charner and Latouche-Tréville were then assigned to the Eastern Mediterranean where they blockaded the Ottoman-controlled coast and supported Allied operations. During this time, Amiral Charner helped to rescue several thousand Armenians from Syria during the Armenian genocide of 1915. She was sunk in early 1916 by a German submarine, with only a single survivor rescued. Latouche-Tréville was lightly damaged in 1915 by an Ottoman shell while providing naval gunfire support during the Gallipoli Campaign. Unlike her sisters, Bruix was transferred to the Atlantic to support Allied operations against the German colony of Kamerun in September 1914. She was briefly assigned to support Allied operations in the Dardanelles in early 1915 before she began patrolling the Aegean Sea and Greek territorial waters.

Latouche-Tréville became a training ship in late 1917 and was decommissioned in 1919. Bruix was decommissioned in Greece at the beginning of 1918 and recommissioned after the end of the war in November for service in the Black Sea against the Bolsheviks. She returned home later in 1919 and was reduced to reserve before she was sold for scrap in 1921. Latouche-Tréville was stricken from the navy list in 1920 and was sold for scrap in 1926.

Notes

Bibliography

 

 

 
Cruiser classes
Ships built in France
World War I cruisers of France
Ship classes of the French Navy